The following page lists power stations in Slovakia.

Nuclear

Thermal

Fossil

Gas power plants

Hydroelectric 

Further many hydro power stations with a total maximum capacity of 50 MW exist.

See also 
 List of largest power stations in the world

References 

Slovakia
 
Lists of buildings and structures in Slovakia